The Mater Private Hospital is a private hospital in Cork, Ireland. It is associated with Mater Private Hospital in Dublin.


History
The hospital was founded by surgeons Joseph Sheehan and Jimmy Sheehan, who had established the Blackrock Clinic in Dublin It was built at a cost of €90m and opened by the Minister for Foreign Affairs, Micheál Martin, TD on 15 October 2010. After the hospital failed to reach agreement with the insurer, VHI, to provide cover, it was closed on 9 March 2011. KPMG was appointed as liquidator in May 2011. The hospital was subsequently acquired by Mater Private and re-opened in 2012.

Services
The hospital has 102 in-patient beds and 6 operating theatres.

References

Hospital buildings completed in 2010
Buildings and structures in Cork (city)
Hospitals in County Cork
Private hospitals in the Republic of Ireland
2010 establishments in Ireland
Hospitals established in 2010
21st-century architecture in the Republic of Ireland